Karunamoyee metro station (or Senco Gold & Diamonds Karunamoyee metro station for sponsorship reasons) is a station of Kolkata Metro Line 2, serving Kaurnamoyee area of Saltlake City, Kolkata. It is located just beside the Karunamoyee bus terminal.

Station

Layout

References 

Kolkata Metro stations
Railway stations in Kolkata